Department of Computer Engineering is the youngest department of the Faculty of Engineering, University of Peradeniya established in 2001 with 20 undergraduate students. At present, there are approximately 60 students in each batch.

History
The Department of Computer Engineering was established in the Faculty of Engineering in Peradeniya in 1985. Although it is the youngest department in the Faculty, it is the oldest Computer Engineering Department to be established in the University system of the country. The main function of the department initially was to conduct programming courses to the students in all disciplines of the Faculty. Over the years the department has developed into a fully-fledged department and it now offers several courses in Computer Engineering to the students.

The demand from the students for Computer Engineering has been high and a limited number is admitted to follow it. The graduates who have specialized in Computer Engineering are highly sought after by local as well as foreign employers. In view of the good employment prospects for Computer Engineering graduates and the large demand from the students, the department has initiated a degree programme leading to the B.Sc. Eng. degree in Computer Engineering from year 2001.

ACES: Association of Computer Engineering Students
ACES is the official club representing the student body of the department. It was formed in 2001. The organization is headed by the ACES council (consisting of undergraduates as the president, secretary, and committee and a senior treasurer from the academic staff).

ACES organizes the following events annually.
 ACES Coders
 ACES hackathon 
 Spark 
 ESCaPE - Project Symposium
 Career fair

Laboratories and resources

 Embedded Systems and Computer Architecture Lab
 Hardware and Computer Interfacing Lab
 Computer Networking Lab

References

External links 

Student Project Portfolio Site 
Profiles of the Student and Academic Staff 
Embedded Systems and Computer Architecture Lab 
Computer Vision Research Group
Pera-Swarm Project

Computer Engineering